Baba Kalu is a local Saint revered by the people of the Hoshiarpur and Phagwara areas of the Punjab, India.

History
Baba Kalu was born in Barial, a village in Hoshiarpur during medieval times. He spent his final days in the village of Panch Nangal near the village Khushalpur in Hoshiarpur where his wooden sandals are still kept.

The main shrine of Baba Kalu is in Panshta (also known as Panchhat).

Baba Kalu was of the Manauti surname and had two sons: Ganesha and Mehesha. The latter left issue who are styled Bawas and live in the villages of Panshta, Barial, Panch Nangal, Khutiar and Kahnpur. He also had 4 disciples: Lachhmi Chand, Sri Chand, Megh Chand and Tara Chand from whose descendants a priest is elected. 

The shrine in Panshta hosts the annual Baisakhi Mela.  A representative of the shrine travels to the villages that attend the Mela to gather contributions. People from many villages attend the Mela including people from the adjoining villages of Narur and Jalwehra as well as people from Lakhpur and Sahni.

Photo gallery

References

Punjabi people
Punjabi folk religion